The Brazilian patrol boat Macaé is  the lead ship of s of the Brazilian Navy.

Design and description
The ship is equipped with a 40 mm cannon, two 20 mm guns, two propulsion engines, three power generators and communications equipment that allow to be in continuous contact with other ships and Navy organizations.

Built by the shipbuilding industry of Ceará SA (INAC), the vessel's name is a tribute to the coastal city of Rio de Janeiro, an important center of support for offshore oil exploration in Brazil. The keel of Macaé was laid down on November 24, 2006, the first of a new class of patrol boats. The Macaé class  is based on the design of the French Vigilante 400 CL54 patrol ship, which was amended and improved to incorporate technological developments and improvements in the performance of the ship.

With a battery life of 10 days and mileage over 4,500 km Macaé assists in the supervision of the Brazilian legal waters (AJB), developing the activities of patrol ships, naval inspection, safety of life at sea, pollution control sea and protection of oil fields in the sea, besides contributing to the national security of maritime traffic.

Seeking to nationalize the implementation of the construction project the patrol vessel Macaé, the Navy has achieved an overall 60%. Among the modern nationalized systems, whose high degree of complexity add cutting-edge technology to the industrial sector involved, included the System Monitoring and Control of Machines (SCM) and the Intelligent Tactical Terminal (TTI).

References 

Patrol vessels of the Brazilian Navy
Ships built in Brazil
2009 ships